Jack Gilford (born Jacob Aaron Gellman; July 25, 1908 – June 4, 1990) was an American Broadway, film, and television actor. He was nominated for the Academy Award for Best Supporting Actor for Save the Tiger (1973).

Early life
Gilford was born on the Lower East Side of Manhattan and grew up in Williamsburg, Brooklyn. His parents were Romanian-born Jewish immigrants Sophie "Susksa" (née Jackness), who owned a restaurant, and Aaron Gellman, a furrier. Gilford was the second of three sons, with an older brother Murray ("Moisha") and a younger brother Nathaniel ("Natie").

Gilford was discovered working in a pharmacy by his mentor Milton Berle. While working in amateur theater, he competed with other talented youngsters, including a young Jackie Gleason. He started doing imitations and impersonations. His first appearance on film was a short entitled Midnight Melodies in which he did his imitations of George Jessel, Rudy Vallee and Harry Langdon. Gilford developed some unique impressions that became his trademarks — most notably, one of "split pea soup coming to a furious boil" using only his face. Other unusual impressions he created were a fluorescent light going on in a dark room, John D. Rockefeller Sr. imitating Jimmy Durante, and impressions of animals.

Career
In 1938, Gilford worked as the master of ceremonies in the first downtown New York integrated nightclub, Café Society owned and operated by Barney Josephson. He was a unique blend of the earlier style of the Yiddish theater, vaudeville and burlesque, and started the tradition of monology such as later comedians Lenny Bruce and Woody Allen used. He won numerous industry awards.

Gilford was nominated for several Tony Awards for best supporting actor as Hysterium in A Funny Thing Happened on the Way to the Forum (1963), and for his role as Herr Schultz in Cabaret (1966). He was nominated for an Academy Award for Best Supporting Actor in (1973) for his role as Phil Green in Save the Tiger (his co-star Jack Lemmon won for Best Actor). Sir Rudolf Bing engaged Gilford for the comic speaking role of the tippling jailer Frosch in the operetta Die Fledermaus. Loved in the part, Gilford performed it 77 times between 1950 and 1964.

One of Gilford's specialties was pantomime, and this talent was put to good use by director George Abbott when he cast Gilford as the silent King Sextimus in Once Upon a Mattress (Off-Broadway, 1959). Gilford shared the stage with a young Carol Burnett in this production, and reprised his performance with her in two separate televised versions of the show, in 1964 and in 1972.

Gilford's career was derailed for a time during the 1950s and McCarthyism. He was an activist who campaigned for social change, integration and labor unions. He was quite active both socially and politically in left-wing causes, as was his wife, Madeline Lee. In 1953 Gilford and Lee were called to testify before the House Un-American Activities Committee (HUAC) regarding their alleged Communist sympathies, after being specifically named by choreographer Jerome Robbins in his own testimony to the committee. The couple had difficulty finding work during much of the rest of the 1950s due to the Hollywood blacklist, and often had to borrow money from friends to make ends meet.

Gilford found work towards the end of the 1950s and during the early 1960s with the end of the Joseph McCarthy era. He made his comeback as Hysterium in the 1962 Broadway musical A Funny Thing Happened on the Way to the Forum. He co-starred in the play with his close friend, Zero Mostel, who was also blacklisted during the McCarthy era. This production was also choreographed by Jerome Robbins, who had previously testified before House Un-American Activities Committee in 1953.

Gilford became successful mostly through roles on the Broadway stage, such as Drink To Me Only, Romanoff and Juliet, and The Diary of Anne Frank. He later enjoyed success in film (one of his notable roles was in the 1985 film Cocoon) and television, as well as a series of nationwide television commercials for Cracker Jack.

Personal life
Gilford met actress (and later producer) Madeline Lee at progressive political meetings and events during the late 1940s. Gilford entertained at many of these events, some of them produced by Lee. She was married at the time and divorced her first husband soon after meeting Gilford. The couple married in 1949, remaining together for 40 years until his death in 1990. The couple raised three children: Lisa Gilford, a producer (from Lee's previous marriage); Joe Gilford, a screenwriter/playwright/stage director; and Sam Max Gilford, an artist/archivist.

Death
Following a year-long battle with stomach cancer, Gilford died in his Greenwich Village home in 1990, aged 81. His wife, Madeline Lee Gilford, died on April 15, 2008, from undisclosed causes. Gilford is buried in the Yiddish theater section of Flushing, New York's Mount Hebron Cemetery.

Biographical play, Finks
In July 2008, Josh Radnor and Jennifer Westfeldt starred in the premiere of the play Finks, based on the Gilfords' experiences with HUAC and the Hollywood blacklist, written by Joe Gilford (their son), and directed by Charlie Stratton for stage and film. The play was produced Off-Broadway at New York's Ensemble Studio Theatre in April 2013. 

The New York Times called it a "bracing play" that "quickly leaves you not caring that you've visited the territory before." Finks was nominated for a Drama Desk Award for Outstanding Play, with Miriam Silverman nominated for Outstanding Actress in a Play.

Broadway stage appearances
 Meet the People (1940–1941, musical revue)
 They Should Have Stood in Bed (1942, play)
 Alive and Kicking (1950, musical revue)
 The Live Wire (1950, play)
 The World of Sholem Aleichem (1953, play, Off-Broadway)
 The Diary of Anne Frank (1955–1957, play)
 Romanoff and Juliet (1957–1958, play)
 Drink to Me Only (1958, play)
 Look After Lulu (1959, play)
 Once Upon a Mattress (1959, musical) – Gilford initially played the role of King Sextimus Off-Broadway. When the show moved to Broadway, the role was played by Will Lee instead. Gilford, though, reprised his Sextimus performance for two television productions of the musical.
 The Tenth Man (1959–1961, play)
 A Funny Thing Happened on the Way to the Forum (1962–1964, musical)
 Cabaret (1966–1968, musical)
 Three Men on a Horse (1969–1970, play, revival)
 No, No, Nanette (1971, revival, musical)
 The Sunshine Boys (1973–1974, play, replacement for Jack Albertson)
 Sly Fox (1976–1978, play)
 The Supporting Cast (1981, play)
 The World of Sholem Aleichem (1982, play, revival)

Filmography

Partial discography
 You Don't Have to be Jewish (1965)
 Cole Porter: Anything Goes, conducted by John McGlinn; EMI Records (1989)

Awards and nominations

References

External links
 
 
 
 Jack and Madeline Gilford papers, 1938-2005, held by the Billy Rose Theatre Division, New York Public Library for the Performing Arts
 

1908 births
1990 deaths
American male film actors
American people of Romanian-Jewish descent
American male musical theatre actors
American male television actors
Hollywood blacklist
Jewish American male actors
Musicians from Brooklyn
People from the Lower East Side
Deaths from stomach cancer
Vaudeville performers
Deaths from cancer in New York (state)
20th-century American male actors
20th-century American singers
20th-century American male singers
People from Williamsburg, Brooklyn
People from Greenwich Village
Burials at Mount Hebron Cemetery (New York City)
20th-century American Jews